Asociația Club Sportiv Electrica 1929 Timișoara commonly known as Electrica Timișoara, or simply as Electrica is a Romanian amateur football club based in Timișoara, Timiș County. It is currently playing in the Liga V, Seria III.

The colors of the team are white and blue.

History
Until 1932, Electrica played in the western regional tournament, one of the five, before the winners would go to play in a knock-out tournament in the fall. Chinezul Timișoara was the team who usually won the tournaments. In 1932 the national league was created called Divizia A. Again, but this time Ripensia Timișoara took the lead and qualified to play in that league. As more teams were added in the 1933-1934 season a second division Divizia B was created, followed by 1936–37 Liga III season of the third division Liga III, where they finished 5th. The second division had two series, the clubs from the west side of the country played in Seria II. 

The team now activates in the fifth league, Timis County league, Seria III. In the last decade the club focused its attention in growing players for other teams so the academy had very good results at the regional and national level.

Honours
Liga III
Best place 5th: 1936–37
Liga IV – Timiș County
Winners (2): 1992–93, 1995–96

Grounds

Stadionul Electrica is a multi-purpose stadium in Timișoara, Romania. It is currently used mostly for football matches and is the home ground of Electrica Timișoara, ACS Poli Timișoara and Ripensia Timișoara. The stadium holds 5,000 people and is located in the Fabric neighbourhood. In the past it was also the home ground of Politehnica II Timișoara.

In the past, Stadionul UMT, which was placed just a few meters away, was named also as Stadionul Electrica, fact that created some confusion over time.

Rivalries
The traditional rivals of Electrica in the interwar period were Chinezul Timișoara, Politehnica Timișoara and Ripensia Timișoara, that last from the same neighborhood, Fabric.

Later on UM Timișoara and CFR Timișoara.

References

External links
 ACS Electrica Timișoara at frf-ajf.ro

Association football clubs established in 1929
Football clubs in Timiș County
Sport in Timișoara
Liga III clubs
Liga IV clubs
1929 establishments in Romania